Myron is a genus of snakes in the family Homalopsidae. They are commonly known as 'mangrove snakes'.

Geographic range
Snakes of the genus Myron are found in Australia, Indonesia and Papua New Guinea.

Species
Myron karnsi 
Myron resetari 
Myron richardsonii

References

Further reading
Gray JE (1849). Catalogue of the Specimens of Snakes in the British Museum. London: Trustees of the British Museum. (Edward Newman, printer). xv + 125 pp. (Myron, new genus, p. 70; M. richardsonii, new species, p. 70).

Snake genera
 
Taxa named by John Edward Gray